The 2014 FIA World Rally Championship-2 was the second season of the World Rally Championship-2, an auto racing championship recognized by the Fédération Internationale de l'Automobile, running in support of the World Rally Championship. It was created when the Group R class of rally car was introduced in 2013.The Championship was open to cars complying with R4, R5, Super 2000 and Group N regulations. The Championship is composed by thirteen Rallies, and Drivers and Teams must nominate a maximum of seven event. The best six results were counted towards the championship.

Former Formula One driver Robert Kubica did not return to defend his 2013 title as he joined the sport's premier category.

The Title went to Nasser Al-Attiyah finishing six the last event, winning the championship by three points over Jari Ketomaa (who won the event). Lorenzo Bertelli finished the championship in third position.

Calendar

Teams and drivers

Driver changes
 Reigning World Rally Championship-3 champion Sébastien Chardonnet moved up to the WRC-2.
 Jari Ketomaa took part in his first full season of competition, having made regular guest appearances in a variety of WRC championships for the past decade.
 Kristian Sohlberg returned to the World Rally Championship after a six-year absence. Sohlberg drove a Ford Fiesta R5 prepared by M-Sport and run by Autotek Motorsport. He last competed at World level in the now-defunct Production World Rally Championship in 2007.
 After losing his seat with the M-Sport World Rally Team in 2013, Ott Tänak alternated between contesting the WRC-2 season and competing in the WRC at rallies which are not nominated for points.

Regulation changes
 All competitors registered in the Championships–WRC, WRC-2, WRC-3 and the Junior WRC—were obliged to use a colour-coded windscreen sticker to distinguish its category.
 Drivers were no longer assigned permanent numbers, except upon request.

Rally summaries

Notes:
  – The Monte Carlo Rally was shortened when a competitor stopped on Stage 14, blocking traffic and forcing organisers to abandon the stage.

Championship standings

FIA World Rally Championship-2 for Drivers

Points are awarded to the top 10 classified finishers.

FIA World Rally Championship-2 for Co-Drivers

FIA World Rally Championship-2 for Teams

FIA World Rally Championship-2 for Production Car Drivers

FIA World Rally Championship-2 for Production Car Co-Drivers

References

External links
Official website of the World Rally Championship
Official website of the Fédération Internationale de l'Automobile

 
World Rally Championship 2